Graeco-Phrygian is a proposed subgroup of the Indo-European language family which comprises the Hellenic and Phrygian languages.

Modern consensus views Greek as the closest relative of Phrygian, a position that is supported by Brixhe, Neumann, Matzinger, Woodhouse, Ligorio, Lubotsky, and Obrador-Cursach. Furthermore, out of 36 isoglosses collected by Obrador Cursach, Phrygian shared 34 with Greek, with 22 being exclusive between them. The last 50 years of Phrygian scholarship developed a hypothesis that proposes a proto-Graeco-Phrygian stage out of which Greek and Phrygian originated, and if Phrygian was more sufficiently attested, that stage could perhaps be reconstructed.

Evidence
The linguist Claude Brixhe points to the following features Greek and Phrygian are known to have in common and in common with no other language:
 a certain class of masculine nouns in the nominative singular ending in -s
 a certain class of denominal verbs
 the pronoun auto-
 the participial suffix -meno-
 the stem kako-
 and the conjunction ai

Obrador-Cursach (2019) has presented further phonetic, morphological and lexical evidence supporting a close relation between Greek and Phrygian, as seen in the following tables that compare the different isoglosses between Phrygian, Greek, Armenian, Albanian and Indo-Iranian.

Other proposals
Greek has also been variously grouped with Armenian and Indo-Iranian (Graeco-Armenian; Graeco-Aryan), Ancient Macedonian (Hellenic) and, more recently, Messapic. Greek and Ancient Macedonian are most often classified under Hellenic; at other times, ancient Macedonian is seen as a Greek dialect and thus, Hellenic is posited to consist of only Greek dialects. The linguist Václav Blažek states that, in regard to the classification of these languages, "the lexical corpora do not allow any quantification" (see corpus and quantitative comparative linguistics).

References

Bibliography

Further reading 

 Anfosso, Milena. "Le Phrygien: une langue balkanique perdue en Anatolie" [Phrygian: a Balkan Language Lost in Anatolia]. In: Anatolie: de l'époque archaïque à Byzance. Actes de la journée doctorale organisée à l'université de Paris-Sorbonne dirigée par Anaïs Lamesa, Giusto Traina. Dialogues d'histoire ancienne n°. 22. Besançon: Presses Universitaires de Franche-Comté, 2021. 37-66. .
 
 
 
 
 

Graeco-Phrygian
Unclassified Indo-European languages